The 1991–92 season was Mansfield Town's 55th season in the Football League and 13th in the Fourth Division they finished in 3rd position with 77 points gaining an instant return to the Third tier.

Final league table

Results

Football League Fourth Division

FA Cup

League Cup

League Trophy

Squad statistics
 Squad list sourced from

References
General
 Mansfield Town 1991–92 at soccerbase.com (use drop down list to select relevant season)

Specific

Mansfield Town F.C. seasons
Mansfield Town